Katherine "Katie" Rose Clarke (born August 25, 1984 in Friendswood, Texas) is an American musical theater actress.

Early life
Clarke was born on August 25, 1984 in Friendswood, Texas. She got her start acting and singing in the United Methodist Church. Clarke is a BFA musical theatre graduate of Sam Houston State University.

Career
She first came to national attention for her portrayal of Clara Johnson in the Broadway production, the live PBS broadcast, and the national tour of The Light in the Piazza.

She made her Broadway debut in The Light in the Piazza on December 9, 2005, at the age of 21, at the Vivian Beaumont Theater under the name "Katie Clarke". Clarke succeeded Kelli O'Hara in the part of Clara Johnson, after O'Hara had left the show to play Babe Williams opposite Harry Connick Jr. in The Pajama Game.

Her other theater credits include Craig Lucas' 2007 play Prayer for my Enemy at the Long Wharf Theatre in New Haven, Connecticut and the Deborah Abramson/William Finn musical revue Travels With My Discontent at the Barrington Stage Company. She also performed in the regional production of TUTS Houston Anything Goes in the ensemble. She was profiled in The New York Times in January 2006.

Clarke then portrayed the role of Glinda on the first national tour of the musical Wicked. She succeeded Christina DeCicco on November 6, 2007 and starred alongside Carmen Cusack as Elphaba, who was later replaced by her standby Donna Vivino. She left the company in San Diego, California on August 16, 2009 and was replaced by Chandra Lee Schwartz.

She later reprised the role of Glinda at the Gershwin Theatre on Broadway on January 14, 2010, replacing Erin Mackey. She starred alongside Dee Roscioli, Mandy Gonzalez and Teal Wicks during her run. Clarke took medical leave in March/April 2011, during which time the role of Glinda was played by Laura Woyasz. Clarke left the Broadway company on September 25, 2011 and was replaced again by Schwartz.

Clarke returned to the 1st National Tour of Wicked as Glinda on November 15, 2011, replacing Amanda Jane Cooper. She was joined by Kyle Dean Massey, who had played the role of Fiyero alongside her in the Broadway production. During this run, she starred opposite Mamie Parris as Elphaba.

She and Massey finished their limited engagement with the tour company on February 23, 2012, with Alli Mauzey replacing Clarke as Glinda. She returned to the role of Glinda in the Broadway production of Wicked from April 23, 2013 to September 22, 2013, where she starred alongside Willemijn Verkaik and later Lindsay Mendez. She was replaced by Alli Mauzey, whom she herself had replaced when she rejoined the show.

In November 2013, Clarke made her cabaret debut at 54 Below, where she performed a mix of acoustic pop, folk, country, and original songs.

In March 2014, Clarke appeared in the York Theatre Company's production of the 1960 musical Tenderloin as part of their Musicals in Mufti series.

In May 2014, Clarke returned to the Long Wharf Theatre to star as Cathy Hyatt in Jason Robert Brown's two person musical, The Last Five Years.

In October 2015, Clarke originated the role of Hannah in the Broadway production of Allegiance, which closed in February 2016. She was cast as Ellen in the Broadway revival of Miss Saigon, which began performances on March 1, 2017 and closed on January 14, 2018. Clarke once again returned to the role of Glinda in the Broadway production of Wicked beginning December 11, 2018, replacing Amanda Jane Cooper. She starred opposite Jessica Vosk and played her final performance on April 7, 2019, being replaced by Ginna Claire Mason. Clarke currently holds the record for longest-running actress to play the role of Glinda on Broadway.

In 2020, Clarke starred as Tary in the groundbreaking musical podcast, Propaganda!

Personal life
On December 15, 2012 she married Christopher Alan Rogers. Their wedding was held with special memories in Galveston, Texas and the couple reside in New York City. In April 2018, Clarke announced her pregnancy with her and Rogers' first child, due in June 2018. Clarke gave birth to their daughter Eleanor Rose Rogers on June 18, 2018.

Credits

 Broadway
 Miss Saigon as Ellen Scott (2017-2018)
 Allegiance as Hannah Campbell (2015)
 Wicked as Glinda (replacement) (2010-2011; 2013; 2018-2019)
 The Light in the Piazza as Clara Johnson (replacement) (2005–2006)

 Off-Broadway
 Merrily We Roll Along as Beth Spencer (2022-2023)

 Regional Theater
 The Heart of Rock and Roll as Cassandra (2018)
 The Last Five Years as Cathy (2014)
 Tenderloin (2014)
 Anything Goes (2007)
 Prayer for my Enemy as Marianne (2007)
 Travels With My Discontent (2006)

 National Tours
 Wicked as Glinda (replacement) (2007-2009; 2011-2012)
 The Light in the Piazza as Clara Johnson

 Readings
 I Can Get It For You Wholesale (2017)

 Concerts
 Parade as Mrs. Frances Phagan at Lincoln Center (2015)
 Back on the Ground at 54 Below (2013)

 Television and Film
 Maybe There's a Tree as Jane (post-production)
 Relevant as Sharon (2016-2017) 5 episodes
 The Good Wife as Reena Booth (2014) 1 episode Live from Lincoln Center: The Light in the Piazza as Clara Johnson / Herself (2006)

 Podcasts
 Propaganda! The Podcast Musical'' as Tary (2020)

References

External links
Katie Rose Clarke interview
Katie Rose Clarke interview
Broadway.com Article
Theatermania Article

1984 births
Actresses from Texas
American musical theatre actresses
Living people
Singers from Texas
Sam Houston State University alumni
People from Friendswood, Texas
American United Methodists
20th-century Methodists
21st-century Methodists